Jaime Paglia is an American screenwriter, director and producer. He is best known for creating and producing Eureka (2006–12).

Life and career
He attended the University of California at Santa Cruz majoring in economics for three weeks, before finding his passion with the theatre arts/film program. He minored in English literature.

His first show business endeavour was as an assistant in feature film publicity at MGM Studios, which led to him meeting many executives. For his first script, he partnered with college friend, Andrew Cosby, and sold a spec to New Line Cinema.

Eureka
In 2003, Paglia and Cosby sold their dramedy Eureka to Syfy as a pitch. In July 2006, the series premiered to critical and viewer success. Over the course of the show's six-year run and 77 episodes, Paglia contributed to 20. He made his directing debut with the fifth-season episode, "Jack of All Trades".

The Flash
In summer 2014, Paglia was hired as a writer on the DC Comics produced CW superhero series The Flash. He co-wrote the series' 6th episode, "The Flash Is Born", which introduced the supervillain Girder.

Scream TV Series
In 2015, Paglia, a former co-executive producer and executive producer of the MTV slasher series Scream, was credited as the writer for two episodes.

Filmography

Television 
The numbers in credits refer to the number of episodes.

References

External links

20th-century American writers
20th-century American male writers
American male screenwriters
American television directors
American television producers
Living people
American male television writers
Place of birth missing (living people)
Showrunners
Year of birth missing (living people)